The French destroyer Milan was one of six  (contre-torpilleurs) built for the French Navy in the interwar period.

Service
Following the German invasion of Norway in April 1940, Milan escorted two convoys carrying French troops of the Chasseurs Alpins to Namsos and Harstad between 18 April and 27 April.

On 15 June she carried General de Gaulle from Brest to Plymouth on the first stage of his journey to London for talks with the British government.

After France surrendered to Germany, Milan served with the naval forces of Vichy France. She was at Casablanca in French Morocco when Allied forces invaded French North Africa in Operation Torch on 8 November 1942. She was in action against United States Navy TF 34 during the Naval Battle of Casablanca and was beached after sustaining damage from US warships and aircraft. Older work on the subject have errantly attributed Milan’s crippling to shell hits from the destroyer , which had broken off action against Milan at least 25 minutes prior to the French ship being knocked out of the fight (which occurred shortly before 10:00). French reports list a 406mm (16”) shell among the damage Milan incurred, in addition to two more shells, probably 8”, that struck her immediately thereafter. However, the damage sustained by Milan attributed to a 406mm (16") shell is most likely to have been caused by a bomb from aircraft from the USS Ranger, as a 406mm (16") shell would have passed through the thinly armoured destroyer without exploding. It is noteworthy that the US Navy, who were able to examine her wreck after the action, did not identify that damage as being consistent with one of their own 406mm (16") shells, and have never claimed that the USS Massachusetts struck Milan.

Notes

References

 
 O'Hara, Vincent (2015). Torch: North Africa and the Allied Path to Victory. Annapolis, Maryland: Naval Institute Press. ISBN 1-61251-823-0

Aigle-class destroyers
Ships built in France
Maritime incidents in November 1942
1931 ships